Harrington is a village and former civil parish on the Cumbrian coast south of Workington and north of Whitehaven in England. Historically part of Cumberland, its industrial history, which largely ended in the late 1930s, included a shipbuilders, iron works, coal mining and steel making. It once had five railway stations. It still has one railway station, on the Cumbrian Coast Line, near the harbour.

Today, with a population of approximately 3,800, measured at 3,167 in the 2011 Census, it is largely a dormitory village for the employees of the shops and offices and light industry found in Workington. Whitehaven, and Sellafield further down the coast. In 1951 the parish had a population of 2303.

The parish consisted of Harrington itself, High Harrington and Salterbeck, which is a large housing estate on the Workington side of the parish.

History

The name Harrington, is derived from three Anglo-Saxon words; Har or Harr (a man's name), ingas (people) and ton (settlement/estate/enclosure). The original settlers were a group of people whose leader called himself Har. The original inhabitants of land would have called themselves Haringas (Har's people) and the settlement Haringa tun (estate of the Haringas). Other local place names with similar origins would be Workington, Distington and Frizington.

Governance
Harrington,  is part of the Workington constituency of the UK parliament. The current Member of Parliament is Mark Jenkinson, a member of the Conservative Party. 2019 marks only the second time since the Second World War that a Conservative has been elected for Workington, the first being at the 1976 by-election.

For the European Parliament residents in Harrington voted to elect MEP's for the North West England constituency.

On 1 April 1974 the parish was abolished to form Workington unparished area. It is now (in 2022) a ward of Workington Town Council in the civil parish of Workington. The ward includes Grayson Green and High Harrington.

Harbour

In 1760, Henry Curwen built a quay at Harrington on the south side of the River Wyre. Coal and limestone were soon being exported from Harrington, and the increase in trade led to the development of the local shipbuilding industry. A decline in manufacturing industry saw the harbour's usage drop dramatically during the latter part of the 19th century.

Eventually the harbour was sealed off and used as a reservoir for a nearby magnesium works. The secret "Magnesite" plant at Harrington was set up during the Second World War by the Ministry of Aircraft Production to extract magnesium from seawater, for use in aircraft components and incendiary bombs.

The harbour now has a new lease of life as a facility for leisure, with the scope to grow the marine sector in the Northwest.

Churches
Harrington had many churches, and four remain as churches today. At St Mary's Church there are recent stained-glass windows, which show much of the industrial and maritime heritage of the area. There is also the Roman Catholic St Mary's Church that was founded by Benedictine monks, built by a Charles Walker of Newcastle, cost £2,3000 and funded by public subscription.

Cycle network
The West Cumbria Cycle Network passes through Harrington on its way from Distington to Workington. It uses the route of the former Cleator and Workington Junction Railway through High Harrington railway station.

See also

Harrington railway station
High Harrington railway station

References

External links

Cumbria County History Trust: Harrington (nb: provisional research only - see Talk page)
Harrington History Group

Ports and harbours of Cumbria
Populated coastal places in Cumbria
Former civil parishes in Cumbria
Workington